Lissonoschema fasciatum is a species of beetle in the family Cerambycidae. It was described by Fisher in 1944.

References

Trachyderini
Beetles described in 1944